Volleyball at the 2004 Summer Paralympics was staged at the Helliniko Fencing Hall from 21 to 27 September. Two sitting volleyball team events were held, one for men and one for women. The sport is performed sitting down, on a smaller court with a lower net.

This was the first Summer Paralympic Games without standing volleyball events, which had been included from the introduction of volleyball in 1976 (when sitting volleyball was a demonstration event) through 2000.

The tournament brought Bosnia and Herzegovina their first ever Paralympic gold medal. Their team consisted of players injured in the War of 1992-95.

Men's tournament 

The men's tournament was won by the team representing .

Results

Preliminaries 
For ranking purposes - no elimination

Group B

Competition bracket

Classification 5–8

Team lists

Women's tournament 

The women's tournament was won by the team representing .

Results

Preliminaries

Competition bracket

Classification 5/6

Team lists

See also 
Volleyball at the 2004 Summer Olympics

References 

2004 Summer Paralympics events
2004